Phasgonophora sulcata is a species of chalcidid wasp in the family Chalcididae.

References

Further reading

External links

 

Parasitic wasps
Insects described in 1832
Chalcidoidea